Shlomo Deri is an Israeli lawyer, businessman, politician, and founder of the Respect for Tradition Party (Kavod U’Masoret Party). He was part of Shas negotiating team that negotiated its position in the government following the 2015 Israeli legislative election. He is a brother of Aryeh Deri.

See also
Yehuda Deri

References

Living people
Israeli Jews
Leaders of political parties in Israel
Year of birth missing (living people)
Deri family